Souvlaki (plural:), is a popular Greek fast food consisting of small pieces of  meat and sometimes vegetables grilled on a skewer. It is usually eaten straight off the skewer while still hot. It can be served with or inside of a rolled pita, typically with  lemon, sauces, vegetables such as sliced tomato and onion, and fried potatoes as a side. The meat usually used in Greece and Cyprus is pork, although chicken, beef, and lamb may also be used in some regions as well as worldwide.

Etymology
The word souvlaki is a diminutive of the Medieval Greek  ( meaning "skewer") itself borrowed from Latin . "Souvlaki" is the common term in Macedonia (Greece) and other regions of northern Greece, while in southern Greece and around Athens it is commonly known as kalamaki ( meaning "small reed").

History

In Greek culture, the practice of cooking food on spits or skewers dates to the Bronze Age. Excavations in Santorini, Greece, unearthed sets of stone cooking supports used by the natives of the island before the Thera eruption of the 17th century BC; souvlaki was "a popular delicacy in Santorini back in 2000 BC." In the stone cooking supports, there are pairs of indentations that were likely used for holding skewers and the line of holes in the base allowed the coals to be supplied with air. 

In Mycenaean Greece, "souvlaki trays" were discovered in Gla, Mycenae, and Pylos. The "souvlaki trays" (or portable grills) used by the Mycenaean Greeks were rectangular ceramic pans that sat underneath skewers of meat. It is not clear whether these trays would have been placed directly over a fire or if the pans would have held hot coals like a portable barbecue pit. Spit supports appear to "continue in use into the Early Iron Age at Nichoria." In Greek literature, Homer in the Iliad (1.465) mentions pieces of meat roasted on spits (ὀβελός); this is also mentioned in the works of Aristophanes, Xenophon, Aristotle, and others.

Modern-day souvlaki was described by Gustave Flaubert, a French traveler, who observed Greeks "grilling pieces of meat on a bamboo stick" during his visit to the Boeotian countryside of southern Central Greece in 1850. However, modern-day souvlaki was not widely distributed in Greece until after World War II. Souvlaki skewers served as fast food started to be sold widely in the 1960s, after being introduced by vendors from Boeotia. The first known use of the word souvlaki in English was in 1942.

Variations

Kalamaki
Kalamaki ( meaning "small reed") is a synonym for souvlaki proper in Athens where the word souvlaki is used colloquially for any kind of pita wraps. Kalamaki can also be accompanied with vegetables such as tomato, peppers, and onions, and a sauce, with lemon wedges. There are some places in Greece where kalamaki is not connected in any way to souvlaki such as Thessaloniki; in these regions, souvlaki refers to the dish that in Athens is called kalamaki.

Souvlaki-merida
Merída (μερίδα) means portion in Greek. While souvlaki is eaten plain as a fast food, it is also served as a full plate, served with fried potatoes, vegetables, sauce, and quartered pita bread. Usually it consists of the ingredients of a souvlaki-pita (see below) laid out on a plate. Lamb is mostly used, but others can be used, such as ox.

Souvlaki pita
Souvlaki-pita consists of grilled souvlaki meat wrapped in a lightly grilled pita along with sliced tomatoes and onions, and tzatziki sauce, and fried potatoes on the side – though increasingly they may be added to the wrap.  

In some areas, when chicken is used instead of pork, tzatziki and onions are replaced with a special yellow mustard sauce and lettuce.  Other garnishes and sauces include, ktipiti, Russian salad, and  melitzanosalata.

Corfu
In Corfu, a special tomato sauce is added to souvlaki, plainly called "red sauce".

Cyprus

In Cyprus, souvlaki can refer both to the small chunks of meat on a skewer, and to the dish. It is made with a large pita that has a pocket-style opening. Into this is placed the meat (traditionally lamb or pork, more recently sheftalia or chicken), which in Cypriot souvlaki is cut into slightly larger chunks. Tomatoes, cucumbers and shredded white cabbage are the usual salad additions. Onion, parsley, and pickled green chili peppers are popular accompaniments, as are yogurt and tzatziki. Cut lemons are always included with souvlaki, as they are with all grilled meats in Cyprus. Lettuce is not traditional and is seldom used in souvlaki outside of tourist resorts.

See also
Arrosticini – Abruzzese Italian version of skewered meat
Doner kebab and its variants, including the Arab shawarma, Greek gyro, and Mexican al pastor
Pinchitos – Southern Spanish version of skewered meat
Ražnjići – Balkan version of skewered meat
Satay – Southeast Asian version of skewered meat
Shashlik – Central Asian version of skewered meat
Shish kebab – Small pieces of meat grilled on a skewer
Tsukune – Japanese version of skewered meat

References

Citations

General and cited sources

External links

Meat dishes
Greek cuisine
Cypriot cuisine
Grilled skewers
Street food
Greek inventions
Greek words and phrases
National dishes